The Bay of Biscay, known in Spain as the Gulf of Biscay, and in France and some border regions as the Gulf of Gascony, is a gulf of the northeast Atlantic Ocean located south of the Celtic Sea. It lies along the western coast of France from Point Penmarc'h to the Spanish border, and the northern coast of Spain west to Cape Ortegal. The south area of the Bay of Biscay that washes over the northern coast of Spain is known locally as the Cantabrian Sea.

Name
The Bay of Biscay is named (for English speakers) after Biscay on the northern Spanish coast, probably standing for the western Basque districts (Biscay up to the early 19th century). Its name in other languages is:
 
 
 
  (named after Gascony, France)
 
 
  ( Cantabricus, Cantabrorum, Gallaecum)
  (mar Cantábrico for the ocean area closer to the Spanish coast, the Cantabrian Sea)

Geography

Parts of the continental shelf extend far into the bay, resulting in fairly shallow waters in many areas and thus the rough seas for which the region is known. Large storms occur in the bay, especially during the winter months. The Bay of Biscay is home to some of the Atlantic Ocean's fiercest weather; abnormally high waves occur there. Up until recent years it was a regular occurrence for merchant vessels to founder in Biscay storms.

Extent
The International Hydrographic Organization defines the limits of the Bay of Biscay as "a line joining Cap Ortegal to Penmarch Point".

The southernmost portion is the Cantabrian Sea.

Rivers
The main rivers that empty into the Bay of Biscay are Loire, Charente, Garonne, Dordogne, Adour, Nivelle, Bidasoa, Oiartzun, Urumea, Oria, Urola, Deba, Artibai, Lea, Oka, Nervión, Agüera, Asón, Miera, Pas, Saja, Nansa, Deva, Sella, Nalón, Navia, Esva, Eo, Landro and Sor.

Climate
In late spring and early summer a large fog triangle fills the southwestern half of the bay, covering just a few kilometres inland.

As winter begins, weather becomes severe. Depressions enter from the west very frequently and they either bounce north to the British Isles or they enter the Ebro Valley, dry out, and are finally reborn in the form of powerful thunderstorms as they reach the Mediterranean Sea. These depressions cause severe weather at sea and bring light though very constant rain to its shores (known as orballo, sirimiri, morrina, orbayu, orpin or calabobos). Sometimes powerful windstorms form if the pressure falls rapidly (Galernas), traveling along the Gulf Stream at great speed, resembling a hurricane and finally crashing in this bay with their maximum power, such as the Klaus storm.

The Gulf Stream enters the bay following the continental shelf's border anti-clockwise (the Rennell Current), keeping temperatures moderate all year long.

Main cities

The main cities on the shores of the Bay of Biscay are Bordeaux, Bayonne, Biarritz, Nantes, La Rochelle, Donostia-San Sebastián, Bilbao, Santander, Gijón and Avilés.

History
The southern end of the gulf is also called in Spanish "Mar Cantábrico" (Cantabrian Sea), from the Estaca de Bares, as far as the mouth of Adour river, but this name is not generally used in English. It was named by Romans in the 1st century BC as Sinus Cantabrorum (Bay of the Cantabri) and also, Mare Gallaecum (the Sea of the Galicians). On some medieval maps, the Bay of Biscay is marked as El Mar del los Vascos (the Basque Sea).

The Bay of Biscay has been the site of many famous naval engagements over the centuries. In 1592 the Spanish defeated an English fleet during the Battle of the Bay of Biscay. The Biscay campaign of June 1795 consisted of a series of manoeuvres and two battles fought between the British Channel Fleet and the French Atlantic Fleet off the southern coast of Brittany during the second year of the French Revolutionary Wars.  sank here after striking a naval mine on 22 June 1918. In 1920  sank after losing power and drifting into a reef in a storm with the loss of 575 lives. All hands were lost.

On 12 April 1970,  sank in the Bay of Biscay due to a fire that crippled the submarine's nuclear reactors. An attempt to save the sub failed, resulting in the death of forty sailors and the loss of four nuclear torpedoes. Due to the great depth, no salvage operation was attempted.

Wildlife

Plaiaundi Ecology Park 
The Plaiaundi Ecology Park is a 24 -hectare coastal wetland lying where the Bidasoa River meets the sea in the Bay of Biscay.The nature of Plaiaundi consists of a wide variety of flora (visitors view them mainly in the spring) and fauna (visitors with binoculars arrive all during the year, because of the birds migratory habits).This nature park contains a variety of birds, reptiles, mammals and insects.

Marine mammals

The car ferries from Gijón to Nantes/Saint-Nazaire, Portsmouth to Bilbao and from Plymouth, Portsmouth and Poole to Santander provide one of the most convenient ways to see cetaceans in European waters. Often specialist groups take the ferries to hear more information. Volunteers and employees of ORCA regularly observe and monitor cetacean activity from the bridge of the ships on Brittany Ferries' Portsmouth to Santander route. Many species of whales and dolphins can be seen in this area. Most importantly, it is one of the few places in the world where the beaked whales, such as the Cuvier's beaked whale, have been observed relatively frequently. Biscay Dolphin Research monitored cetacean activity from the P&O Ferries cruiseferry Pride of Bilbao, on voyages from Portsmouth to Bilbao.

North Atlantic right whales, one of the most endangered whales, once came to the bay for feeding and probably for calving as well, but whaling activities by Basque people almost wiped them out sometime prior to the 1850s.

The best areas to see the larger cetaceans are in the deep waters beyond the continental shelf, particularly over the Santander Canyon and Torrelavega Canyon in the south of the Bay.

The alga Colpomenia peregrina was introduced and first noticed in 1906 by oyster fishermen in the Bay of Biscay.

Grammatostomias flagellibarba (scaleless dragonfish) are native to these waters.

See also
 Asturias
 Basque Country
 Biscay
 Cantabria
 Galicia

References

External links

 

 
Biscay
Biscay
Gulfs of the Atlantic Ocean
Green Spain
Shipping Forecast areas
France–Spain border
Landforms of Nouvelle-Aquitaine
Landforms of Brittany
Landforms of Pays de la Loire
Geography of Nouvelle-Aquitaine
Geography of the Basque Country (greater region)
Geography of Western Europe
Geography of Southern Europe